Bhinga is a constituency of the Uttar Pradesh Legislative Assembly covering the city of Bhinga in the Shravasti district of Uttar Pradesh, India.

Bhinga is one of five assembly constituencies in the Shravasti Lok Sabha constituency.

Election results

2022

2017

Bahujan Samaj Party candidate MOHAMMAD ASLAM won in 2017 Uttar Pradesh Legislative Elections defeating Bhartiya Janta Party candidate ALEKSHENDRA KANT SINGH by a margin of 6,090 votes.

16th Vidhan Sabha: 2012 General Elections

References

External links
 

Assembly constituencies of Uttar Pradesh
Shravasti district